YMCI may refer to:
York Mills Collegiate Institute, a high school in Toronto, Canada
Young Men's Christian Institute, a forerunner of the University of Westminster, London, England
York Memorial Collegiate Institute, a high school located in Toronto, Ontario